The Swartz Covered Bridge, near Wyandot, Ohio, was built in 1880.  It was listed on the National Register of Historic Places in 1976.

It is a Howe truss covered bridge.

It is located northwest of Wyandot on County Road 130, in Antrim Township, Wyandot County, Ohio.

It is covered in the Ohio Historic Places Dictionary.

References

External links

Covered bridges in Ohio
National Register of Historic Places in Wyandot County, Ohio
Bridges completed in 1880